Laisrén may refer to:

Saint Laisrén mac Nad Froích (died 564), patron saint of Devenish Island
Saint Lasrén mac Feradaig (died 605), third abbot of Iona
Saint Molaise of Leighlin (died 639), abbot of Leighlin and hermit of Holy Isle
Saint Laisrén mac Decláin (fl. 6th century), patron saint of Inishmurray
Saint Laisren of Cloonkerrill (fl. 5/6th century), saint in County Galway